Ludell is an unincorporated community in Rawlins County, Kansas, United States. As of the 2020 census, the population of the community and nearby areas was 41.

History
Ludell has a post office with ZIP code 67744.  The first post office in Ludell was established in 1876. From the years 1876 until 1881, the post office was called either Danube, Kelso, or Prag for some time.

Demographics

For statistical purposes, the United States Census Bureau has defined Ludell as a census-designated place (CDP).

Education
The community is served by Rawlins County USD 105 public school district.

References

Further reading

External links
 Rawlins County maps: Current, Historic, KDOT

Unincorporated communities in Rawlins County, Kansas
Unincorporated communities in Kansas
1876 establishments in Kansas
Populated places established in 1876